Susan Burke may refer to:
 Susan L. Burke (born 1962), American lawyer
 Susan Theresa Burke, American writer, actress and stand up comic